All the Things We Do in the Dark is a young adult psychological thriller novel by Saundra Mitchell, published October 29, 2019 by HarperTeen. The book was shortlisted for the Lambda Literary Award for Children's and Young Adult Literature.

The novel follow 17-year-old Ava, who experienced a sexual assault in her childhood, after she finds a woman's corpse in the woods. Instead of reporting to the police, Ava "protect[s] and care[s] for her," enlisting the help of the victim's friend to solve the case.

Reception 
All the Things We Do in the Dark received a starred review from Publishers Weekly.

Kirkus Reviews referred to the novel as a "searing, fast-paced whodunit that addresses sexual assault head-on," while Booklist called it  an "insightful, cathartic read." Booklist further highlighted how "Mitchell mixes contemporary drama—the joy of first love, the pain of breaking friendships—with psychological thriller."

Both Booklist and The Bulletin of the Center for Children’s Books highlighted the Mitchell's author's note, which includes contact information for sexual assault helplines.

School Library Journal also provided a positive review.

All the Things We Do in the Dark was shortlisted for the Lambda Literary Award for Children's and Young Adult Literature.

References 

Harper & Row books
American LGBT novels
2010s LGBT novels
Psychological thriller novels
2019 LGBT-related literary works
2019 children's books